José de Jesus Mendes (born 16 January 1947) is a former Portuguese footballer who played as defender.

Football career 

Mendes gained 8 caps for Portugal and made his debut against Belgium on 21 November 1971 in Lisbon, in a 1-1 draw.

External links 
 
 

1947 births
Living people
Portuguese footballers
Association football defenders
Primeira Liga players
Vitória F.C. players
Sporting CP footballers
Portugal international footballers